POLIN Museum of the History of Polish Jews is a museum on the site of the former Warsaw Ghetto. The Hebrew word Polin in the museum's English name means either "Poland" or "rest here" and relates to a legend about the arrival of the first Jews to Poland.

The museum's cornerstone was laid in 2007, and the museum opened on 19 April 2013. The core exhibition opened in October 2014 and features a multimedia exhibition about the Jewish community that flourished in Poland for a thousand years up to the World War II Holocaust.

The building, a postmodern structure in glass, copper, and concrete, was designed by Finnish architects Rainer Mahlamäki and Ilmari Lahdelma.

History 

The idea for creating a major new museum in Warsaw dedicated to the history of Polish Jews was initiated in 1995 by the Association of the Jewish Historical Institute of Poland. In the same year, the Warsaw City Council allocated the land for this purpose in Muranów, Warsaw's prewar Jewish quarter and site of the former Warsaw Ghetto, facing the Monument to the Warsaw Ghetto Heroes. In 2005, the Association of the Jewish Historical Institute of Poland established a private-public partnership with the Polish Ministry of Culture and National Heritage and the City of Warsaw. The museum's first director was Jerzy Halbersztadt. In September 2006, a specially designed tent called Ohel (the Hebrew word for tent) was erected for exhibitions and events at the site of the museum's future location.

An international architectural competition to design the building was launched in 2005, supported by a grant from the Ministry of Culture and National Heritage. On June 30, 2005, the winner was announced by the jury as the team of two Finnish architects, Rainer Mahlamäki and Ilmari Lahdelma. On June 30, 2009, construction of the building was officially inaugurated. The project was completed in 33 months at a cost of 150 million zlotys allocated by the ministry and the city,  with  a total cost of 320 million zloty. It is financially supported by annual funds from the Polish Ministry of Culture and Warsaw City Council.

The building opened and the museum began its educational and cultural programs on April 19, 2013, on the 70th Anniversary of the Warsaw Ghetto Uprising. During the 18 months that followed, more than 180,000 visitors toured the building, visited the first temporary exhibitions, and took part in cultural and educational programs and events, including film screenings, debates, workshops, performances, concerts, and lectures. The Grand Opening, with the completed Core Exhibition, took place on October 28, 2014. The Core Exhibition documents and celebrates the thousand-year history of the Jewish community in Poland that was decimated by the Holocaust.

In 2016 the museum won the European Museum of the Year Award from the European Museum Forum.

Construction 

The museum faces the memorial commemorating the Warsaw Ghetto Uprising of 1943. The winner of the architectural competition was Rainer Mahlamäki, of the architectural studio 'Lahdelma & Mahlamäki Oy in Helsinki, whose design was chosen from 100 submissions to the international architectural competition. The Polish firm Kuryłowicz & Associates was responsible for construction. The building's minimalist exterior is clad with glass fins and copper mesh. Silk screened on the glass is the word Polin, in Latin and Hebrew letters.

The central feature of the building is its cavernous entrance hall. The main hall forms a high, undulating wall. The empty space is a symbol of cracks in the history of Polish Jews. Similar in shape to gorge, which could be a reference to the crossing of the Red Sea known from the Exodus. The museum is nearly 13,000 square meters of usable space. At the lowest level, in the basement of the building will be placed the main exhibition about the history of Jews from the Middle Ages to modern times. The museum building also has a multipurpose auditorium with 480 seats, temporary exhibition rooms, an education center, an information center, a playroom for children, café, shop, and a future kosher restaurant.

Since the museum presents the whole history of Jews in Poland, not only the period under German occupation, the designer wanted to avoid similarities to existing Holocaust museums (such as the Jewish Museum in Berlin and the museum at Yad Vashem) which had austere concrete structures. The architects kept the museum in the colors of sand, giving it a more approachable feeling.

The interior design was conceived and master-planned by London-based museum design consultancy, Event Communications, along with local firms.

In 2008, the design of the museum was awarded the Chicago Athenaeum International Architecture Award. In 2014, the designer Rainer Mahlamäki was awarded the Finlandia Prize for Architecture for his design of the museum.

Organizational structure 
The Core Exhibition's academic team consists of Barbara Kirshenblatt-Gimblett (Program Director) of New York University, Hanna Zaremska of the Institute of History of the Polish Academy of Sciences, Adam Teller of Brown University, Igor Kąkolewski of the University of Warmia and Mazury, Marcin Wodziński of the University of Wrocław, Samuel Kassow of Trinity College, Barbara Engelking and Jacek Leociak of the Polish Center for Holocaust Research at the Polish Academy of Sciences, Helena Datner of the Jewish Historical Institute, and Stanisław Krajewski of Warsaw University. Antony Polonsky of Brandeis University is the Core Exhibition's chief historian.

American Friends of POLIN Museum of the History of Polish Jews is a U.S. based non-profit organization supporting the foundation of the museum.

On June 17, 2009, the museum launched the Virtual Shtetl portal, which collects and provides access to essential information about Jewish life in Poland before and after the Holocaust in Poland. The portal now features more than 1,240 towns with maps, statistics, and image galleries based in large measure on material provided by local history enthusiasts and former residents of those places.

Core exhibition 
It consists of eight galleries that document and celebrate the thousand-year history of the Jewish community in Poland  – once the largest Jewish community in the world – that was almost entirely destroyed during the Holocaust. The exhibition includes a multimedia narrative with interactive installations, paintings and oral histories, among other features created by more than 120 scholars and curators. One item is a replica of the roof and ceiling of a 17th-century Gwoździec synagogue.

Galleries

Forest 
This gallery tells the tale of how, fleeing from persecution in Western Europe, the Jews came to Poland. Over the next thousand years, the country would become the largest European home for the Jewish community.

First Encounters (10th century-1507) 
This gallery is devoted to the first Jewish settlers in Poland. Visitors meet Ibrahim ibn Jakub, a Jewish diplomat from Cordoba, author of famous notes from a trip to Europe. One of the most interesting objects presented in the gallery is the first sentence written in Yiddish in the prayer book of 1272.

Paradisus Iudaeorum (1569-1648) 
This gallery presents how the Jewish community was organized and what role Jews played in the country's economy. One of the most important elements in this gallery is an interactive model of Kraków and Jewish Kazimierz, showing the rich culture of the local Jewish community. Visitors learn that religious tolerance in Poland made it a "Paradisus Iudaeorum" (Jewish paradise). This golden age of the Jewish community in Poland ended with pogroms during the Khmelnitsky Uprising. This event is commemorated by a symbolic fire gall leading to the next gallery.

The title of the gallery has been subject to some criticism and debate among scholars due to the antisemitic roots of the proverb it is taken from, a 17th-century condemnation of the "rampant prevalence of the infidels".

The Jewish Town (1648-1772)

This gallery presents the history of Polish Jews until the period of the partitions. It is shown by an example of a typical borderland town where Jews constituted a significant part of the population. The most important part of this gallery is a unique reconstruction of the roof and ceiling of Gwoździec, a wooden synagogue that was located in pre-war Poland.

Encounters with Modernity (1772-1914)
This gallery presents the time of the partitions when Jews shared the fate of Polish society divided between Austria, Prussia and Russia. The exhibition includes the role played by Jewish entrepreneurs, such as Izrael Kalmanowicz Poznański, in the industrial revolution in Polish lands. Visitors also learn about changes in traditional Jewish rituals and other areas of life, and the emergence of new social movements, religious and political.

On the Jewish Street (1914-1939)

This gallery is devoted to the period of the Second Polish Republic, which is seen – despite the challenges that the young country had to face – as a second golden age in the history of Polish Jews. A graphic timeline is presented, indicating many of the most important political events of the interwar period. The exhibition also highlights Jewish film, theater, and literature.

Holocaust (1939-1944)
This gallery shows the tragedy of the Holocaust during the German occupation of Poland, which resulted in the deaths of approximately 90 percent of the 3.3 million Polish Jews. Visitors are shown the history of the Warsaw Ghetto and introduced to Emanuel Ringelblum and the clandestine group of volunteers that went by the code name Oyneg Shabbos, who collected documents and solicited testimonies and reports chronicling life in the Ghetto during the Nazi occupation. The gallery also portrays the horrors experienced by the Poles during World War II as well as their reactions and responses to the extermination of Jews.

Postwar Years (1944-present)
The last gallery shows the period after 1945, when most of the survivors of the Holocaust emigrated for various reasons, including the post-war takeover of Poland by the Soviets, the hostility of some portion of the Polish populace, and the state-sponsored anti-Semitic campaign conducted by the communist authorities in 1968. An important date is the year 1989, marking the end of Soviet domination, followed by the revival of a small but dynamic Jewish community in Poland.

The exhibition was developed by an international team of scholars and museum professionals from Poland, the United States and Israel, in conjunction with the museum's curatorial team under the direction of Prof. Barbara Kirshenblatt-Gimblett.

See also
History of the Jews in Poland
Gwoździec Synagogue
Galicia Jewish Museum
Yad Vashem
Jewish Museum in Berlin
United States Holocaust Memorial Museum

Notes

References

External links

 Museum of the History of the Polish Jews at sztetl.org.pl
 The North American Council of the Museum at mhpjnac.org
 Read about museum at culture.pl
 "POLIN: A Light Unto the Nations", by David G. Roskies, Jewish Review of Books, 2015
 POLIN Museum of the History of Polish Jews at Google Cultural Institute

Jewish Polish history
Museums in Warsaw
Jewish museums in Poland
History museums in Poland
Museums established in 2013
Museum of the History of Polish Jews
Museum of the History of Polish Jews
Buildings and structures by Finnish architects
Jews and Judaism in Warsaw
21st-century religious buildings and structures in Poland